Kevin Obanor (born June 12, 1999) is an American college basketball player for the Texas Tech Red Raiders of the Big 12 Conference. He previously played for the Oral Roberts Golden Eagles.

Early life and high school career
Obanor grew up in Houston, Texas and was cut from his eighth-grade basketball team. He began focusing on basketball as a sophomore at Alief Hastings High School after experiencing a growth spurt. Obanor transferred to Mount Zion Christian Academy, where he also competed in football and cross country. He received some major Division I college attention, but was ranked a two-star prospect. Obanor committed to Oral Roberts, as he was drawn to their faith-based mission.

College career
Obanor skipped his final semester of high school and arrived at Oral Roberts in January 2018, opting to redshirt the season. As a redshirt freshman, Obanor led the Golden Eagles in scoring with 14.4 points per game while also posting 7.2 rebounds per game. He was named Summit League Freshman of the Year as well as Second Team All-Summit League. He averaged 12.3 points and 6.8 rebounds per game as a sophomore.

On January 2, 2021, Obanor scored a career-high 39 points and had 10 rebounds in a 95–83 win against Omaha. He recorded 14 points in the semifinals of the Summit League Tournament against South Dakota State, including a buzzer-beating tip-in to  carry the Golden Eagles to a 90–88 victory. Obanor helped 15 seed Oral Roberts reach the Sweet 16 of the NCAA Tournament. He posted 30 points and 11 rebounds in the upset against Ohio State, followed by 28 points and 11 rebounds against Florida. As a redshirt junior, Obanor averaged 18.7 points and 9.6 rebounds per game. He was named to the First Team All-Summit League.

Following the season, Obanor transferred to Texas Tech, choosing the Red Raiders over Arkansas. He averaged 10 points and 5.5 rebounds per game. Obanor announced after the season that he was returning for his fifth season of eligibility. On January 30, 2023, Obanor posted 24 points and 13 rebounds in a 80-77 overtime win over Iowa State and surpassed the 2,000-point mark.

Career statistics

College

|-
| style="text-align:left;"| 2017–18
| style="text-align:left;"| Oral Roberts
| style="text-align:center;" colspan="11"|  Redshirt
|-
| style="text-align:left;"| 2018–19
| style="text-align:left;"| Oral Roberts
| 27 || 11 || 23.2 || .581 || .413 || .827 || 7.4 || .5 || .1 || .3 || 14.8
|-
| style="text-align:left;"| 2019–20
| style="text-align:left;"| Oral Roberts
| 31 || 28 || 24.6 || .475 || .388 || .800 || 6.8 || .7 || .4 || .8 || 12.3
|-
| style="text-align:left;"| 2020–21
| style="text-align:left;"| Oral Roberts
| 28 || 28 || 31.9 || .503 || .463 || .875 || 9.6 || 1.1 || .5 || .7 || 18.7
|-
| style="text-align:left;"| 2021–22
| style="text-align:left;"| Texas Tech
| 37 || 37 || 26.1 || .467 || .336 || .761 || 5.5 || .5 || .3 || .4 || 10.0
|- class="sortbottom"
| style="text-align:center;" colspan="2"| Career
| 123 || 104 || 26.3 || .503 || .395 || .823 || 7.2 || .7 || .3 || .5 || 13.6

See also
 List of NCAA Division I men's basketball players with 2,000 points and 1,000 rebounds

References

External links
Texas Tech Red Raiders bio
Oral Roberts Golden Eagles bio

1999 births
Living people
American men's basketball players
Basketball players from Houston
Oral Roberts Golden Eagles men's basketball players
Small forwards
Texas Tech Red Raiders basketball players